Admiral Barton may refer to:

Andrew Barton (privateer) (c. 1466–1511), Lord High Admiral of Scotland
John Kennedy Barton (1853–1921), U.S. Navy rear admiral
Matthew Barton (Royal Navy officer) (c. 1715–1795), British Royal Navy admiral